Heinrich Balss (3 June 1886 – 17 September 1957) was a German zoologist, specialising in Crustacea, especially decapods.

A number of taxa are named in his honour:
Balssia Kemp, 1922
Podocallichirus balssi (Monod, 1935)
Detocarcinus balssi (Monod, 1956)
Trizocheles balssi (Stebbing, 1914)
Rhynchocinetes balssi Gordon, 1936
Ctenocheles balssi Kishinouye, 1926
Lebbeus balssi Hayashi, 1992
Galathea balssi S. Miyake & K. Baba, 1964

References

Further reading

1886 births
1957 deaths
20th-century German zoologists
German carcinologists
Ludwig Maximilian University of Munich